Dr. Padma (born 5 January 1945 in Uppiliapuram, Trichinopoly District) is an Indian medical doctor and politician. She is the daughter of M. Sengamalam, married C. Nammalvar in 1966. She obtained a M.B.B.S. degree from Thanjavur Medical College.

The Indian National Congress fielded Dr. Padma as its candidate for Nagapattinam (SC) seat in the 1991 Indian general election. She won the seat, obtaining 49.71% of the votes, defeating the incumbent Communist Party of India parliamentarian M. Selvarasu. Dr. Padma was the second woman to be elected to the Lok Sabha from the central districts of Tamil Nadu since Independence.

Padma was elected to the Tamil Nadu Legislative Assembly from the Nannilam constituency in the 1996 elections. The constituency was reserved for candidates from the Scheduled Castes. She stood as a candidate of the Tamil Maanila Congress (TMC) party.

Ahead of the 2001 Tamil Nadu Legislative Assembly election The Hindu claimed that the TMC leadership had doubts about fielding Dr. Padma again as candidate in Nannilam.

References

1945 births
Living people
Indian National Congress politicians from Tamil Nadu
Lok Sabha members from Tamil Nadu
India MPs 1991–1996
Tamil Nadu MLAs 1996–2001
Tamil Maanila Congress politicians
20th-century Indian women politicians
20th-century Indian politicians
People from Nagapattinam district
Women members of the Tamil Nadu Legislative Assembly